The Americas Zone was one of the three zones of the regional Davis Cup competition in 1995.

In the Americas Zone there were three different tiers, called groups, in which teams compete against each other to advance to the upper tier. Winners in Group II advanced to the Americas Zone Group I. Teams who lost their respective ties competed in the relegation play-offs, with winning teams remaining in Group II, whereas teams who lost their play-offs were relegated to the Americas Zone Group III in 1996.

Participating nations

Draw

 and  relegated to Group III in 1996.
 promoted to Group I in 1996.

First round

Ecuador vs. Cuba

Guatemala vs. Bolivia

Paraguay vs. Colombia

Haiti vs. Canada

Second round

Ecuador vs. Guatemala

Canada vs. Colombia

Relegation play-offs

Bolivia vs. Cuba

Haiti vs. Paraguay

Third round

Canada vs. Ecuador

References

External links
Davis Cup official website

Davis Cup Americas Zone
Americas Zone Group II